Nuyina is an icebreaking research and supply vessel intended to support Australian scientific activities and research bases in Antarctica. Capable of deploying a wide range of vehicles, including helicopters, landing barges and amphibious trucks to support the resupply operation, the new ship provides a modern platform for marine science research in both sea ice and open water with a large moon pool for launching and retrieving sampling equipment and remotely operated vehicles.

Design and construction
The original concept was developed by the Danish engineering company Knud E Hansen, and the design and construction is being managed by the Dutch Damen Group, which built the vessel in its Romania yard.

Following contractual agreement on 28 April 2016 with DMS Maritime for delivery, operation and maintenance, the ship's design and construction was contracted to Damen Group. Design was contracted to naval architects Knud E Hansen of Denmark. The keel laying was in August 2017 at Damen's Galați shipyard in Romania. Coins from Denmark, Netherlands, Romania, and Australia, were welded to the keel as part of the keel laying. , about 7,000 tons out of 10,000 had been cut and the base of the hull had been completed. In September 2018 the hull was successfully floated in the building dock and taken to the outfitting quay. It was then towed to Vlissingen in the Netherlands for fitting out.

The vessel was handed over on 19 August 2021, and by September travelled from the Netherlands to Australia.

RSV Nuyina's Ship's Bell 
The bell for the Bridge of RSV Nuyina was presented by the President of the ANARE Club at the ship’s official launch on 18 December 2021. It was manufactured in Maryborough, Queensland, by Olds Engineering, from AS1567 - C92610 commonly referred to as G1 or ‘Admiralty gunmetal’ (88% copper, 10% tin, 2% zinc, supplied by Hayes Metals of New Zealand & Australia).

The bell was engraved in Bendigo, Victoria, by National Engraving, and the bell’s lanyard was made by Dr Barbara Frankel from Tasmania. The whole project, from metal, manufacture, engraving and knotting, was donated by those involved as a gift to the Australian Antarctic Division for RSV Nuyina.

Naming
On 29 September 2017, the name Nuyina (pronounced "noy-yee-nah") was announced by the Minister for the Environment, Josh Frydenberg. The name is the word in the palawa kani language of Aboriginal Tasmanians for the southern lights. The name was suggested by school students in a competition, and is jointly attributed to students from St Virgil's College, Hobart and Secret Harbour Primary School, Perth.

The name Nuyina evokes the names of previous ships involved in Australian Antarctic research and investigation:
Aurora Australis (1989–2020), Australia's previous icebreaking research and resupply vessel
SY Aurora (1876–1918), used by Douglas Mawson for exploring the continent (1910–14) and Ernest Shackleton

Service
Nuyina began sea trials in the North Sea on 23 November 2020.

Nuyina entered Damen Schiedam dry-dock in February 2021 for unspecified reason.

It will be operated by Serco under the direction of the Australian Antarctic Division for the Australian Government and will be supporting science operations in the Antarctic as well as resupplying the Australian Antarctic Division stations: Casey, Davis, Mawson and Macquarie Island.

Due to mechanical problems, Nuyina will be unable to be used during the 2022-23 Antarctic season.

Science capabilities

Scientific Data from RSV Nuyina 
Data from Nuyina can be accessed through https://data.aad.gov.au/.

Fixed laboratories
Air chemistry space
Dry labs x 2
Meteorological lab
Wet labs x 2
Wet well

Containerised laboratories 
15 serviced lab module slots (services equiv to fixed wet labs)
9 serviced support module slots

Science spaces
Aft control room
Aft Deck ~ 500m2
Battery charging rooms x 2
Crows nest
CTD hangar
Electronics laboratory
Foremast
Gas bottles storage lockers x 4
Hazardous material store
Laboratory store
Observation huts
Sea ice refueling area
Sea ice staging area
Sea ice staging drying room
Science cool and cold stores
Science frozen store lobby
Science meeting room
Science Offices
Science Operations Room
Science winch room

Scientific Deployment Systems
A frame 30t static with 10t and 5t winches
Air sampling pipes in foremast x 2
CTD hangar overhead crane
CTD winches fibre optic x 2 (EOM)
Deep core handling system
Deep sea coring winch
Deep sea towing winch fibre optic (EOM)
Drop keels x 2
Forward outboard deployment system 
General purpose CTD hangar winch
General purpose winch
Moonpool and cursor frame
Multi-purpose overhead crane 10t
Sea ice ramp
Side outboard deployment system (SODS)
Towed body winch fibre optic (EOM)
Trawl winches x 2
Tugger winches x 2
Twin net drum

Scientific data collection systems

Scientific Data Management System (SDMS)
KVM matrix switching
Scientific racks

Acoustic
Acoustic doppler current profiler (ADCP) in drop keel
ADCP in hull 
Broadband echo sounders in hull (38, 50, 70, 120 & 200kHz)
Broadband echo sounders in drop keel (18, 38, 70, 120 & 200kHz)
Bubble monitoring cameras and noise monitoring hydrophones for Silent R and acoustic systems
Deep multi beam echo sounder system in hull
High resolution multi beam bathymetric echo sounder (MBES) system in drop keel
Hydrophones for acoustic releases in hull
Hydrophones for mammalian observations in drop keel
Net monitoring transducers in drop keels
Retractable high frequency Omni fisheries sonar
Side looking multi beam in drop keel
Sub bottom profiler in hull
Sound velocity profiler
USBL (ultra-short baseline system) in hull

Atmospheric
Accumulated rain sensor
Air pressure monitor 
Air temperature sensors (port, starboard and foremast)
Automated total sky imager
Ceilometer cloud height sensor
Ice and wave radar
Long wave infrared radiation sensors (port and starboard)
Photosynthetic active radiation (PAR) sensors (port and starboard)
Relative humidity (port and starboard)
Sea surface skin temperature
Solar (short wave) radiation sensors (port and starboard)
UV biometer (port and starboard)
UV radiation sensors (port and starboard)
Wind speed and direction sensors (port, starboard and foremast)
X-band weather radar

Seawater
Acidity (pH)
Conductivity, temperature and salinity (thermosalinograph)
CO2 concentrations in seawater and air
Fast rate repetition fluorometer (FRRF) with flow through chamber
Laser optical particle counter
Optical dissolved O2 sensor
Seawater inlet temperature
System pressure

Science equipment
-86 °C ultra low freezers x 2
-135 °C ultra low freezer
C-channel (science spaces and aft science deck)
Chemical storage freezer x 4
Chemical storage fridge x 4
Compressed instrument air (pure) in labs
CUFES (continuous underway fish egg sampler)
Deck inserts (science spaces and aft science deck)
Display computers
Flammable and corrosive chemical storage cabinets (vented ) x 11
Fumes cupboards x 5
Liquid nitrogen bulk storage and dispenser units (200L) x 2
Reagent grade water in labs 
Science container interface
Trace metal free seawater in labs
Ultra pure (Milli Q) water x 2
Vacuum waste system in labs

Science tender
A frame
Moon pool
Multi beam echo sounder
Science winch
Sub bottom profiler
Sound velocity profiler

References

External links
Damen specification brochure
Knud E. Hansen design details

Icebreakers of Australia
Australia and the Antarctic
Research vessels of Australia
Ships built in Romania
2018 ships